William Hamilton, 2nd Duke of Hamilton KG (14 December 161612 September 1651) was a Scottish nobleman who supported both Royalist and Presbyterian causes during the Wars of the Three Kingdoms.

Life
Hamilton was born at Hamilton Palace in December 1616, the younger son of James Hamilton, 2nd Marquess of Hamilton and Lady Ann Cunningham. Hamilton was educated at the University of Glasgow, and from there travelled to Continental Europe, where he spent time at the court of Louis XIII of France, on his return aged 21 he established himself as a favourite at the court of Charles I in London.

Hamilton was created Earl of Lanark, Lord Machanshyre and Polmont in the Peerage of Scotland in 1639, and in April 1640 was elected Member of Parliament for Portsmouth in the House of Commons of England for the Short Parliament. He became Secretary of State for Scotland. In 1643, he was arrested at Oxford on the orders of King Charles I for "concurrence" with his brother the Duke of Hamilton. He escaped and was temporarily reconciled with the Presbyterian party.

After taking part in the Battle of Kilsyth on the covenanter side, Hamilton was sent by the Scottish Estates of the Realm to treat with Charles I at Newcastle in 1646, when he sought in vain to persuade the king to consent to the establishment of Presbyterianism in England. On 26 September 1647 he signed, on behalf of the Scots, the treaty with Charles known as the "Engagement", at Carisbrooke Castle, and helped to organise the Second English Civil War.

In 1648 Hamilton fled to Holland to the court in exile of the Prince of Wales at The Hague. The following year he succeeded to the Dukedom of Hamilton, the Marquisate of Hamilton, the Earldoms of Arran and Cambridge and Lordhips of Aven and Innerdale following his brother's execution, making him the most senior figure among the Scots Royalist exiles. In 1650, the insignia of the Order of the Garter were conferred upon him. He returned to Scotland with King Charles II in 1650, but, finding a reconciliation with the Marquess of Argyll impossible, he refused to prejudice Charles's cause by pushing his claims.

Hamilton retired to his estates on the Isle of Arran until the Scottish invasion of England during the Third English Civil War, when he acted as colonel of a regiment drawn mainly from his tenantry.

Hamilton died from the effects of wounds received at the Battle of Worcester, at The Commandery, Charles II's headquarters in that city. A neighbouring street, Hamilton Road, is named in his honour.

Family

Hamilton married Lady Elizabeth Maxwell, daughter of James Maxwell, 1st Earl of Dirletoun on 26 May 1638, and had issue:
James Hamilton, Lord Polmont (died in infancy, buried at Westminster Abbey)
Lady Anne Hamilton, married Robert Carnegie, 3rd Earl of Southesk
Lady Elizabeth Hamilton, married 1st Lord Kilmaurs, 2nd Sir David Cunningham of Robertland
Lady Mary Hamilton, married 1st Alexander Livingston, 2nd Earl of Callendar, 2nd Sir James Livingstone of Westquarter, 3rd James Ogilvy, 3rd Earl of Findlater
Lady Margaret Hamilton, married William Blair of that ilk.
Lady Diana Hamilton, (died in infancy)

Leaving four daughters but no male heirs, according to the remainder, the dukedom of Hamilton devolved on Hamilton's eldest surviving niece, Anne, who became Duchess of Hamilton in her own right.

In literature
A highly fictionalised Hamilton is depicted in Nigel Tranter's Montrose trilogy.

Notes

References
Anderson, John, Historical and genealogical memoirs of the House of Hamilton; with genealogical memoirs of the several branches of the family. Edinburgh 1825 
 Balfour Paul, Sir JamesThe Scots Peerage Vols IX. Edinburgh 1907

External links
 Hamilton's last letter to his wife

1616 births
1651 deaths
102
Knights of the Garter
Cavaliers
Members of the Privy Council of Scotland
English MPs 1640 (April)
Politics of Portsmouth
17th-century Scottish peers
17th-century Scottish politicians
Place of birth missing
Earls of Cambridge
William
Peers of Scotland created by Charles I